Damelj is a settlement above the left bank of the Kolpa River in the Municipality of Črnomelj in the White Carniola area of southeastern Slovenia. The area is part of the traditional region of Lower Carniola and is now included in the Southeast Slovenia Statistical Region.

The local church is dedicated to Saint Michael and belongs to the Parish of Vinica. It is a Gothic building that was restyled in 1664. The main altar dates to the late 17th century.

References

External links
Damelj on Geopedia

Populated places in the Municipality of Črnomelj